Liotella endeavourensis is a species of sea snail, a marine gastropod mollusk in the family Skeneidae.

Description

Distribution
This species occurs in Antarctic waters.

References

 Engl W. (2012) Shells of Antarctica. Hackenheim: Conchbooks. 402 pp.

External links
 Southern Ocean Mollusc Database (SOMBASE)

endeavourensis
Gastropods described in 1990